FMH may refer to:
 Fatima Memorial Hospital, in Lahore, Pakistan
 Federal Ministry of Health (Nigeria)
 Feminist Mormon Housewives, a blog
 Fetal-maternal haemorrhage
 Finchley Memorial Hospital, in North Finchley, London
 Fischmarkt Hamburg-Altona, a German logistics company
 Foederatio Medicorum Helveticorum, literally "Swiss Medical Association"
 Frederick Memorial Hospital, in Frederick County, Maryland, United States
 Modern and Humanist France, a French political faction
 Otis Air National Guard Base/Coast Guard Air Station Cape Cod, part of Joint Base Cape Cod in Massachusetts, United States